Tyler Joseph Stewart (born September 21, 1967) is the drummer for the Canadian music group Barenaked Ladies.

Role in Barenaked Ladies
Stewart met Steven Page, Ed Robertson, and Jim Creeggan at the Waterloo Busker Carnival in Waterloo, Ontario, Canada in the summer of 1990, and soon fulfilled the trio's desire for a real kit drummer. When Andy Creeggan (who played congas) returned from a trip to South America to find Stewart on drums, he felt somewhat displaced. Creeggan eventually switched to playing mostly keyboards. Stewart has been with the band ever since. He also adds numerous percussive and melodic elements, including piano on Born on a Pirate Ship.

Stewart utilizes an electronic sampler pad for live performances. During acoustic or smaller shows (or sets within shows), he sometimes plays other percussive elements live, including shakers, bongo drums, and drumming on unusual objects, such as an instrument case.

Stewart is the only band member who has not actively written songs for the group's albums nor does he write for a side project. He has received a writing credit on only three songs in the band's catalogue: "Grade 9" from Gordon, "Why Say Anything Nice?" from Barenaked Ladies Are Men (co-written with Page and Robertson), and "Allergies" from Snacktime! (lyrics co-written with Kevin Hearn, music written by all five then-members). Up until the 2009 acrimonious departure of lead singer Steven Page, Stewart had sung lead on only two recorded songs. Stewart sings lead on "Allergies" and a cover of "Holly Jolly Christmas" which was cut from Barenaked for the Holidays. Stewart also sings lead on a version of "Feliz Navidad" which the band has performed live for holiday shows since 2004. The song has also been played on other occasions with the word "navidad" replaced by lyrics relevant to the event (such as "Feliz Ships and Dip", and "Feliz Halloween", among others). Stewart assumed some of Page's vocal responsibilities for live performances, including "Alcohol" from Stunt. Stewart also sings the chorus on the song "Four Seconds" from All in Good Time.

Early life
Stewart was born in Toronto, but was raised in Newmarket, Ontario. He is the son of Sandra Stewart and stepson of Robert Stewart. Stewart's biological father, Leonard Hawkins, is black, a fact which Stewart learned when he was about 12 years old. His stepfather sang in a Scarborough rock band named "The Wizards of Id", formed at Woburn Collegiate Institute where both Steven Page and Ed Robertson would later attend. He credits his parents' relative youth (they were only 19 when he was born) with exposing him to interesting music which was frequently played around the house when he was young. He has claimed that his unique eyebrows are the result of his shaving them off when he was eight years old.

Stewart is a graduate of Huron Heights Secondary School. He received a Bachelor of Applied Arts degree in Radio and Television Arts from Ryerson Polytechnical Institute (now Toronto Metropolitan University) in 1989, making him the only member of Barenaked Ladies to have earned a degree.

Stewart was a member of The Ambassadors Drum and Bugle Corps, playing bongos and pit percussion from 1979–1980, and tri-drums from 1980 to 1982. He was the drummer for cowpunk/rockabilly band Pogo Rodeo and later 3 Day Bender in the late 1980s. When he met the Barenaked Ladies, at a buskers' festival, he was drumming for the Would Be Goods, a Guelph acoustic duo featuring stage actor Christine Brubaker, and singer Chris Reynolds.

Personal life
Stewart's wife, Jill (née Spratt), is a former high school French teacher, and the two were married on September 19, 1998; they have three daughters, Mili, born April 2, 1999, Hazel, born April 16, 2001 and Carmen, born January 28, 2011. In his spare time, he enjoys cooking. He is a huge hockey fan and actively promotes Women's Hockey in Canada, serving on the board of The Ladies First Hockey Foundation and coaching his daughters' teams, one being The George Bell Titans. Stewart also went to high school with former Leafs goalie Curtis Joseph where the two became friends. He also enjoys playing hockey, and is a member of the Jokers Hockey Club in the Canadian Exclaim! Hockey Summit of the Arts. Stewart is also an occasional panelist/contributor on the post-game show for Hockey Night in Canada, and an on-air contributor to the morning show on The Fan 590. He took part in Super Skate, a celebrity hockey game fundraiser at Madison Square Garden for the Christopher Reeve Foundation in 1999, 2001 and 2002.  Participants included Denis Leary, Kim Alexis, Rick Moranis, Chris Jericho, Gary Dell'Abate, Chad Smith, Darren Pang and Jason Priestley, among others. Stewart is a member of the Canadian Charity Artists Against Racism and has worked with them on campaigns like radio PSAs.

Stewart is the first cousin of Kevin Yarde, a former television presenter for The Weather Network and the current Member of Provincial Parliament for Brampton North in the Legislative Assembly of Ontario.

Drum equipment

Stewart currently plays Sonor drums and Sabian cymbals. He uses Vic Firth drumsticks (mainly 55A and RUTE606). Previously, He had his own signature sticks made by Regal Tip from 2004–2015 which he designed with his drum tech, Rob "Tiny" Menegoni. The sticks were called Ty-phoons (a second, "dipped" version of which was released in the mid-2000s). He also uses a Roland SPD-S sampling multi-trigger pad and Roland Electronic Drums and pads. Stewart uses Aquarian Drumheads.

Prior to his switch to SONOR in early 2015, Tyler played Pearl Drums from mid-2006. Stewart used custom Ayotte drums from at least 1994, and prior to that, Canwood drums.

References

External links
 
 Barenaked Ladies Official Website

1967 births
Black Canadian musicians
Canadian rock drummers
Canadian male drummers
Living people
People from Newmarket, Ontario
Toronto Metropolitan University alumni
Musicians from Toronto
Canadian folk rock musicians
Barenaked Ladies members